Wiśnicze  is a village in the administrative district of Gmina Wielowieś, within Gliwice County, Silesian Voivodeship, in southern Poland.

The village has a population of 311.

The name of the village is of Polish origin and comes from the word wiśnia, which means "cherry".

References

Villages in Gliwice County